Ahle is a , orographically left-hand, tributary of the Schwülme river of Lower Saxony, Germany. It flows into the Schwülme south of Uslar.

See also
 List of rivers of Lower Saxony

References

Rivers of Lower Saxony
Solling
Rivers of Germany